William Reynolds was an American mass murderer who shot nine people, seven of them fatally, in Tuscumbia, Alabama, United States on April 6, 1902, before being shot dead himself.

Police arrived at Reynolds' home in Tuscumbia's black neighborhood to arrest him on a charge of obtaining property under false pretenses. According to the Richmond Planet, Reynolds opened fire immediately on the sheriff and deputy who came to the door, killing both. He barricaded himself in the house and a posse was assembled. In the ensuing gun battle, Reynolds killed seven more white men. After four hours, the posse set fire to the house in which he was barricaded and, in attempting to escape, Reynolds was shot to death. A total of three houses were burned down.

With the sheriff and five deputies of the Colbert County Sheriff's Department among those killed, this was the deadliest incident in Alabama law enforcement history.

Racial tensions were high after the incident and, the following day in nearby Florence, Alabama, a prominent white butcher was arrested for killing and butchering a black patron who praised Reynolds.

Victims
Sheriff Charles Gassaway, 
Deputy William Gassaway, brother of Charles Gassaway
Deputy Jesse Davis
Deputy James Payne
Deputy Pat A. Prout
Deputy Bob Wallace
Hugh Jones

Those wounded were: James Finney and Bob Patterson.

See also
 List of rampage killers in the United States

References

1902 deaths
1902 murders in the United States
20th-century American criminals
People from Tuscumbia, Alabama
American mass murderers
Deaths by firearm in Alabama
1902 in Alabama
Murder in Alabama
Mass shootings in the United States
Law enforcement in Alabama
1860s births
Place of birth missing
African Americans shot dead by law enforcement officers in the United States